This is a list of kawaii metal musical groups. Kawaii metal is a musical genre that blends elements of heavy metal and J-pop that was pioneered in Japan in the early 2010s. Inclusion to this list is based on reliable sources and the musical acts themselves do not necessarily self-identify as such, and some of these groups are also categorized into other rock and metal subgenres.

References 

Kawaii